Chung Jae-hee (born 6 April 1978) is a South Korean badminton player who affiliated with the Samsung Electro-Mechanics. She competed at the 1996 and 2000 Summer Olympics. Together with Ra Kyung-min, they were the champion at the 1999 All England Open. She and Ra were placed first in the women's doubles world ranking in 2002.

Achievements

World Championships 
Women's doubles

Asian Games 
Women's doubles

Asian Championships 
Women's doubles

World Junior Championships 
Girls' doubles

IBF World Grand Prix 
The World Badminton Grand Prix sanctioned by International Badminton Federation (IBF) since 1983.

Women's doubles

Mixed doubles

IBF International 
Women's doubles

References

External links 
 
 

1978 births
Living people
Sportspeople from Busan
South Korean female badminton players
Badminton players at the 1996 Summer Olympics
Badminton players at the 2000 Summer Olympics
Olympic badminton players of South Korea
Badminton players at the 1998 Asian Games
Asian Games silver medalists for South Korea
Asian Games bronze medalists for South Korea
Asian Games medalists in badminton
Medalists at the 1998 Asian Games
World No. 1 badminton players
20th-century South Korean women